An anonymous author known as the Anonimo Gaddiano, Anonimo Magliabechiano, or Anonimo Fiorentino ("the anonymous Florentine") is the author of the Codice Magliabechiano or Magliabechiano, a manuscript with 128 pages of text, probably from the 1530s and 1540s, and now in the Central National Library of Florence (Magliab. XVII, 17). It includes brief biographies and notes on the works of Italian artists, mainly those active in Florence during the Middle Ages.  Among several other suggestions, the anonymous author has been suggested to be Bernardo Vecchietti (1514–1590), a politician of the court of Cosimo I.  The author clearly had intimate access to the Medici court.

The manuscript dates from about 1536 to the mid 1540s and is considered a useful source for the study of the history of Italian art since it is the most comprehensive biographical source for artists before the 1550 edition of Vasari's Lives, which was being compiled over the same period.

While the opening section is devoted to artists from ancient Greece, essentially reprising Pliny the Elder, the most significant part is dedicated to Florentine artists from Cimabue to Michelangelo.  The entries for artists concentrate on lists of works, and lack the full biographical ambition of Vasari.

Contents
The manuscript, which now appears to be incomplete, is considered a particularly useful source for the study of the history of Italian art since it is the most comprehensive biographical source before the 1550 edition of Vasari's Lives, which was being compiled over the same period.

The account of the life of Leonardo da Vinci is especially detailed, and much used by later authors.  One particular point, a later addition to the manuscript, has been much discussed.  This states that Leonardo painted a portrait from life of "Piero Francesco del Giocondo" (or possibly just "Francesco del Giocondo"), respectively the son and the husband of Lisa del Giocondo, usually considered the sitter for the Mona Lisa.  Frank Zöllner argues that the author of the note simply made a mistake, and was referring to the Mona Lisa.

In general, much of the information is the same as in Vasari's Lives, though there are also distinct differences.  It is clear the two authors knew each other, but not clear that either had read the other's work.  Annotations in the MS include notes to ask Vasari for further details, and it is possible that a satirical portrait at the end of the MS records the author's bitterness when he realized that Vasari's publication would eclipse his own efforts, or had already done so.  Like Vasari, the author had access to a version of the material known from the somewhat earlier manuscript of Antonio Billi, from about 1515, which may have been circulated among Florentine art lovers in various redactions.

Provenance
Bernardo Vecchietti, one possible author, was the son of a rich cloth merchant and would only have been in his early twenties when he compiled the manuscript in the early 1540s. He was later a patron of the sculptor Giambologna, and helped Duke Cosimo organize his artistic projects, in 1572 provoking bitter complaints by Vasari, surviving in a letter to Vincenzo Borghini (another figure suggested as the Anonimo Gaddiano).

The manuscript later belonged to the Gaddi family (hence the "Gaddiano" name), descended from the 13th-century artist Gaddo Gaddi, and by the 16th century prominent in banking and the church.  Contemporary members included Cardinals Niccolò Gaddi and Taddeo Gaddi, and the priest Giovanni Gaddi, the last a courtier in Florence at the time, and friend of Vasari and Benvenuto Cellini.  It entered the collection of Antonio Magliabechi, which became the core of the Florentine public library.

The manuscript was forgotten about until published in 1892 by Karl Frey; altogether the manuscript has been published three times in Italian.

Artists mentioned or profiled
These are the artists covered, in the order of their listing, which is broadly chronological. The transcript edited by Frey is fully available online. 

 Cimabue
 Gaddo Gaddi
 Andrea Tafi
 Giotto
 Stefano Fiorentino
 Taddeo Gaddi
 Maso Fiorentino (Maso di Banco)
 Bernardo Daddi
 Pietro Cavallini
 Jacopo del Casentino
 Buonamico Buffalmacco
 Giottino
 Andrea Orcagna
 Agnolo Gaddi
 Antonio Veneziano
 Giovanni da Santo Stefano (Giovanni dal Ponte)
 Gherardo Starnina
 Filippo Brunelleschi
 Lorenzo Ghiberti
 Donatello
 Luca della Robbia
 Antonio del Pollaiuolo
 Masaccio
 Masolino
 Lippo (Lippo Memmi?)
 Ambrogio Lorenzetti
 Simone Martini
 Taddeo di Bartolo
 Giovanni d'Asciano (Giovanni di Guido da Asciano)
 Vecchietta
 Sano pittore (Sano di Pietro)
 Francesco di Giorgio Martini
 Matteo pittore (Matteo di Giovanni)
 Benvenuto pittore (Benvenuto di Giovanni)
 Neroccio pittore (Neroccio di Bartolomeo de' Landi)
 Duccio di Buoninsegna
 Giovanni Pisano
 Andrea Pisano
 Michelozzo
 Desiderio da Settignano
 Andrea del Verrocchio
 Giovanni Francesco Toscani 
 Lorenzo di Bicci
 Bicci di Lorenzo
 Neri di Bicci
 Nanni di Banco
 Antonio Rossellino and Bernardo Rossellino
 Giovanni dal Ponte
 Fra Giovanni da Fiesole (Fra Angelico)
 Lorenzo Monaco
 Dello Delli
 Spinello Aretino
 Filippo Lippi
 Andrea del Castagno
 Paolo Uccello
 Giuliano Pesello
 Francesco Pesellino
 Alesso Baldovinetti
 Domenico Veneziano
 Zanobi Strozzi
 Zanobi Machiavelli
 Baccio da Montelupo
 Benozzo Gozzoli
 Piero del Pollaiuolo
 Sandro Botticelli
 Domenico Ghirlandaio
 Fra Bartolomeo
 Raffaellino del Garbo
 Andrea del Sarto
 Leonardo da Vinci
 Michelangelo Buonarroti
 Cosimo Rosselli
 Pietro Perugino
 Luca Signorelli
 Filippino Lippi
 Francia Bigio

Notes

References
DAH = Dictionary of Art Historians, "Magliabechiano, Anonimo (or Anonymo), "anonymous author of the Magliabechiano MS""
 Rubin, Patricia Lee, Giorgio Vasari: Art and History, 174, 1995, Yale University Press, 780300049091, google books
, Vol. 53., issue 1 (2009), pp. 157–168, JSTOR

External links
 Codice Magliabechiano wrote by Anonimo Fiorentino, 16th century. In Italian, with an Introduction by Karl Frey (1857–1917) in German. Publication date: 1892. [digitized by Google from a collection at Harvard University] archive.org.
 Codice dell'anonimo Gaddiano (cod. Magliabechiano XVII, 17), Biblioteca Nazionale di Firenze. In Italian, with an introduction by Cornelio Fabrizi. [digitized from a collection at Princeton University] Firenze, typography M. Cellini & Co., 1893. hathitrust.org.

Italian manuscripts
16th-century manuscripts
Biographies about artists
Italian art historians
Italian biographers
Compilations of biographies about artists